Faiza Mushtaq (born 18 July 1981) is a Pakistani politician who was a Member of the Provincial Assembly of the Punjab, from May 2015 to May 2018.

Early life and education
She was born on 18 July 1981 in Mandi Bahauddin.

She earned postgraduate degree in Human Resource Management from Institute of Administrative Sciences, Lahore in 2004.

Political career

She ran for the seat of the Provincial Assembly of the Punjab as a candidate of Pakistan Muslim League (N) (PML-N) from Constituency PP-116 (Mandi Bahauddin-I) in 2013 Pakistani general election but was unsuccessful.

In May 2015, she was elected to the Provincial Assembly of the Punjab as a candidate of PML-N on reserved seat for women.

She was re-elected to the Provincial Assembly of the Punjab as a candidate of PML-N on a reserved seat for women in 2018 Pakistani general election.

References

Living people
Punjab MPAs 2013–2018
1981 births
Pakistan Muslim League (N) MPAs (Punjab)
Women members of the Provincial Assembly of the Punjab
21st-century Pakistani women politicians